Pališkėliai (formerly ) is a village in Kėdainiai district municipality, in Kaunas County, in central Lithuania. According to the 2011 census, the village was uninhabited. There is a place of a former cemetery (a heritage object).

Demography

References

Villages in Kaunas County
Kėdainiai District Municipality